Nicholas Longespee was a medieval Bishop of Salisbury.

Longespee was the son of  Ela, 3rd Countess of Salisbury, and William Longespee. He was a canon of Salisbury Cathedral before 1272 and held the office of treasurer of the diocese of Salisbury before 1275. He also held the position of rector of Lacock. Nicholas Longespee was also appointed as the Rector of The Parish of Wyke Regis in Weymouth in 1263. In his will he left money for the relief of the poor in Wyke Regis.

Longespee was elected bishop between 8 November and 12 December 1291 and consecrated on 16 March 1292. He died 18 May 1297. He was buried at Salisbury, but his heart was buried at Lacock and his viscera at Ramsbury.

Citations

References
 British History Online Bishops of Salisbury accessed on 30 October 2007
 British History Online Treasurers of Salisbury accessed on 30 October 2007
 
Parish of Wyke Regis, list of Rectors from 1263 to date

Bishops of Salisbury
13th-century English Roman Catholic bishops
1297 deaths
Younger sons of earls
Year of birth unknown